Antonín Hrabě (born 1902, date of death unknown) was a Czech weightlifter. He competed for Czechoslovakia in the men's featherweight event at the 1924 Summer Olympics.

References

External links
 
 

1902 births
Year of death missing
Czech male weightlifters
Olympic weightlifters of Czechoslovakia
Weightlifters at the 1924 Summer Olympics
Place of birth missing